The 142nd New York State Legislature, consisting of the New York State Senate and the New York State Assembly, met from January 1 to June 16, 1919, during the first year of Al Smith's governorship, in Albany.

Background
Under the provisions of the New York Constitution of 1894, re-apportioned in 1917, 51 Senators and 150 assemblymen were elected in single-seat districts; senators for a two-year term, assemblymen for a one-year term. The senatorial districts consisted either of one or more entire counties; or a contiguous area within a single county. The counties which were divided into more than one senatorial district were New York (nine districts), Kings (eight), Bronx (three), Erie (three), Monroe (two), Queens (two), and Westchester (two). The Assembly districts were made up of contiguous area, all within the same county.

At this time there were two major political parties: the Republican Party and the Democratic Party. The Socialist Party, the Prohibition Party and the Socialist Labor Party also nominated tickets.

Elections
The New York state election, 1918, was held on November 5. This was the first election at which women had the right to vote, and the right to run for elective offices. Two women were elected to the State Assembly: Ida B. Sammis (Rep.) and Mary M. Lilly (Dem.).

Al Smith and Harry C. Walker were elected Governor and Lieutenant Governor, both Democrats. The incumbent Governor Charles S. Whitman ran on the Republican and the Prohibition tickets for re-election, but was defeated by Smith in a tight race, with a plurality of about 15,000 votes out of more than two million.

The other five statewide elective offices up for election were carried by the Republicans. The approximate party strength at this election, as expressed by the vote for Governor, was: Democrats 1,010,000; Republicans 956,000; Socialists 122,000; Prohibition 39,000; and Socialist Labor 5,000.

In New York City, where in November 1917 ten Socialists had been elected to the Assembly by pluralities in three-way races, Republicans and Democrats combined to stem the "red flood", and nominated joint candidates in most of the "Socialist" districts. Thus they managed to outpoll the Socialists in eight of the ten districts; only two Socialists, August Claessens and Charles Solomon, managed to get elected.

Sessions
The Legislature met for the regular session at the State Capitol in Albany on January 1, 1919; and adjourned on April 19.

Thaddeus C. Sweet (R) was re-elected Speaker.

J. Henry Walters (R) was elected president pro tempore of the State Senate.

The Legislature met for a special session at the State Capitol in Albany in the evening of June 16. This session was called to ratify the Nineteenth Amendment to the United States Constitution which established women's suffrage. The amendment was ratified by a vote of 44 to 0 in the Senate, and 137 to 0 in the Assembly. State Senator Henry M. Sage—who was an outspoken opponent of women's suffrage–was, on his request, excused from voting because "he did not care to vote against it, but could not possibly vote to ratify." The Legislature also passed four bills concerning the housing situation in New York City; and adjourned after four hours.

State Senate

Districts

Members
The asterisk (*) denotes members of the previous Legislature who continued in office as members of this Legislature. Peter J. McGarry, Kenneth F. Sutherland, Daniel F. Farrell, Jeremiah F. Twomey and Burt Z. Kasson changed from the Assembly to the Senate.

Employees
 Clerk: Ernest A. Fay
 Sergeant-at-Arms: Charles R. Hotaling
 Assistant Sergeant-at-Arms: 
 Principal Doorkeeper: 
 First Assistant Doorkeeper: 
 Stenographer: John K. Marshall

State Assembly

Assemblymen

Employees
 Clerk: Fred W. Hammond
Deputy Clerk: Wilson Messer
 Sergeant-at-Arms: Harry W. Haines
 Principal Doorkeeper: 
 First Assistant Doorkeeper: 
 Second Assistant Doorkeeper: 
 Stenographer:
Postmaster: James H. Underwood

Notes

Sources
 NOMINEES ANALYZED BY CITIZENS UNION in NYT on October 27, 1918
 THE NEXT LEGISLATURE in NYT on November 6, 1918
 REPUBLICANS' LEAD CUT IN LEGISLATURE in NYT on November 7, 1918
 "WETS" WIN IN SENATE CAUCUS in NYT on January 1, 1919

142
1919 in New York (state)
1919 U.S. legislative sessions